Leng chi tu is a traditional Chinese dish made of spicy (mala) marinated rabbit meat that is typically eaten cold. Its name literally translates to "cold eat rabbit." Leng chi tu is enjoyed in various regions of China, particularly in Sichuan and Guizhou provinces.

It is particularly notable in Zigong.

Taste 
The taste and texture of leng chi tu is spicy and chewy.

Preparation 
The preparation of this dish involves soaking the rabbit meat in a marinade of ginger, garlic, Sichuan peppercorn, and chili oil for several hours. The marinated meat is then boiled and chilled, and served with a variety of dipping sauces.

References

External links 
 Recipe

Sichuan cuisine
Chinese cuisine
Rabbit dishes